Daniel C. Leahy (August 8, 1870 – December 30, 1903) was a shortstop in Major League Baseball. He played two games for the Philadelphia Phillies in 1896.

Leahy was born in Nashville, Tennessee. He started his professional baseball career in 1894, with the Lynchburg Hill Climbers of the Virginia League. In 1895, he hit .309 and was acquired by the Phillies. He played in a doubleheader on September 2, going 2 for 6 at the plate.

Leahy played in the minor leagues until 1900. He was shot to death in 1903, at the age of 33.

References

External links

1870 births
1903 deaths
Baseball players from Nashville, Tennessee
Deaths by firearm in Tennessee
Lynchburg Hill Climbers players
Major League Baseball shortstops
Norfolk Jewels players
Philadelphia Phillies players
19th-century baseball players